HMS Galatea was a 20-gun Sphinx-class sixth-rate post-ship of the Royal Navy. She was designed by John Williams and built by Adam Hayes in Deptford Dockyard being launched on 21 March 1776. She served during the American War of Independence.

History 
In 1776, the ship was sent to North America under the command of Captain Thomas Jordan with a crew of 200. She took part in the capture of 30 American ships. An American naval squadron led by Samuel Elbert attacked the ship near St. Simons Island in what became known as the Frederica naval action. Although the Americans captured her other three escort ships, Galateas crew ran her aground and managed to escape without being captured.

On 28 April 1779 the American cutter "Revenge", captained by Gustavus Conyngham, was captured and the crew were held aboard the Galatea. By his own report he was kept in irons until he reached prison, and was given no more than a “cold plank as my bed, a stone for a pillow”. Additionally, he was not fed properly, causing him to lose fifty pounds while imprisoned on the ship en route to his English prison.

Fate
She was broken up at Sheerness in April 1783.

References 

 

Sphinx-class post ships
1776 ships
Ships built in Deptford